Fahrej may refer to:
Fahraj, a city in Kerman Province, Iran
Iranshahr (city), a city in Sistan and Baluchestan Province, Iran